Thomas Bermingham may refer to:

 Thomas Bermingham (priest) (1918–1998), American Jesuit priest, teacher and scholar
 Thomas Bermingham, 1st Earl of Louth (1717–1799), Anglo-Irish politician and peer
 Thomas de Bermingham (died 1375), Anglo-Irish lord
 Thomas II de Bermingham (died 1473), Anglo-Irish lord
 Thomas III de Bermingham (died 1500), Anglo-Irish lord